Coronado: Stories is a collection of five short stories and a play by the American author Dennis Lehane. "Until Gwen", the collection's fifth story, was published in the June 2004 edition of The Atlantic prior to its inclusion in Coronado.

Contents
 "Running Out of Dog"
 "ICU"
 "Gone Down to Corpus"
 "Mushrooms"
 "Until Gwen"

References

Novels by Dennis Lehane
2006 short story collections